John Brown Francis (May 31, 1791August 9, 1864) was a governor and United States Senator from Rhode Island.

Early life
John Brown Francis was born in Philadelphia, Pennsylvania, on May 31, 1791, son of John Francis and Abigail Brown.  Francis' grandfather, John Brown, was a U.S. Representative from Rhode Island and a member of the family for whom Brown University was named.

He attended the common schools of Providence, Rhode Island, and graduated from Brown University in 1808.

Career
He engaged in mercantile pursuits, attended the Litchfield Law School, and was admitted to the bar but never practiced. Francis was a member of the Rhode Island House of Representatives from 1821 to 1829 and a member of the board of trustees of Brown University from 1828 to 1857. He was a member of the Rhode Island Senate in 1831 and 1842, and was the 13th Governor of Rhode Island from 1833 to 1838.

From 1841 to 1854, Francis was chancellor of Brown University; he was elected as a member of the Law and Order Party to the U.S. Senate to fill the vacancy caused by the resignation of William Sprague and served from January 25, 1844, to March 3, 1845. He was not a candidate for reelection; while in the Senate, he was chairman of the Committee on Engrossed Bills (Twenty-eighth Congress).

Francis was a member of the Rhode Island Senate from 1845 to 1856, and then retired from public life and engaged in agricultural pursuits until his death at "Spring Green," Warwick, Rhode Island, in 1864; interment was in North Burial Ground, Providence.

Personal life
In 1822, he married Anne Carter Brown (1794–1828), daughter of Nicholas Brown, Jr. (1769–1841) and granddaughter of Nicholas Brown, Sr. (1729–1791). Before her death in 1828, they had:
 Abby Francis (1823–1841), who died unmarried
 John Francis (1826–1827), who died an infant
 Anne Brown Francis (1828–1896), who married Marshall Woods (1824–1899), son of Alva Woods and Almira Marshall, in 1848.

In 1832 he married his cousin, Elizabeth Francis (1796–1866), widow of Henry Harrison and daughter of Thomas Willing Francis and Dorothy Willing. Together, they had:
 Elizabeth Francis (1833–1901), who did not have children
 Sally Francis (1834–1904), who did not have children
 Sophia H. Francis (1836–1860), who married George William Adams (1834–1883), son of Seth Adams and Sarah Bigelow, in 1860, who did not have children
 John Brown Francis (1838–1870), who did not have children

On August 9, 1864, John Brown Francis, aged 73, died in Warwick, Rhode Island.

References
Notes

Sources

External links
 

1791 births
1864 deaths
Members of the Rhode Island House of Representatives
Rhode Island state senators
Governors of Rhode Island
Democratic Party governors of Rhode Island
United States senators from Rhode Island
Brown University alumni
Chancellors of Brown University
Rhode Island Whigs
19th-century American politicians
Law and Order Party of Rhode Island politicians
John Brown Francis
Politicians from Philadelphia
Burials at North Burying Ground (Providence)
Litchfield Law School alumni